Aquidneck Island, also known as Rhode Island, is an island in Narragansett Bay in the state of Rhode Island. The 2020 United States Census reported its population as 60,109. The state of Rhode Island is named after the island; the United States Board on Geographic Names recognizes Rhode Island as the name for the island, although it is widely referred to as Aquidneck Island in the state and by the island's residents.

Aquidneck Island is home to three towns: from north to south, Portsmouth, Middletown, and Newport.

Etymology
"Aquidneck" is derived from the Narragansett name for the island aquidnet. Roger Williams was an authority on the Narragansett language, but he stated that he never learned the word's meaning.

European names for the island
European explorers and settlers started introducing their own names for the Island

It is unclear how it came to be known as Rhode Island, but the earliest known use of the name was in 1637 by Roger Williams, and it was officially applied to the island in 1644: "Aquethneck shall be henceforth called the Ile of Rods or Rhod-Island." The name "Isle of Rodes" is used in a legal document as late as 1646.

Another popular origin theory states that Adriaen Block passed by Aquidneck Island during his 1614 expedition, describing it in a 1625 account of his travels as "an island of reddish appearance" (in 17th century Dutch een rodlich Eylande). Dutch maps from as early as 1659 call it "Roode Eylant" or Red Island.  Historians have theorized that it was named by the Dutch (possibly by Adriaen Block himself) for either the red autumn foliage or red clay on portions of the shore.

In 1644, the settlements on Rhode Island (Portsmouth and Newport) united with Providence Plantations and Warwick to form the Colony of Rhode Island and Providence Plantations and, eventually, the State of Rhode Island (formerly State of Rhode Island and Providence Plantations). The entire state is now commonly referred to as Rhode Island, and the official name of Aquidneck Island is still "Rhode Island". The United States Board on Geographic Names addressed the issue in 1930 by using both names of the island on its maps. By 1964, the board decided that having two names was confusing, and "Rhode Island" was used exclusively as the official name. Attempts to change the official name to "Aquidneck Island" have been made as recently as 2004, but all of these have failed. The name Aquidneck Island is widely used in Rhode Island to refer to the island, including by publications such as The Newport Daily News.

History
Colonists settled on Aquidneck Island in 1638 in the region that the Narragansetts called "Pocasset" (meaning "where the stream widens"), the northern part of Portsmouth. They engaged Roger Williams to negotiate the terms of their settlement of the island from the Narragansett sachems Canonicus and Miantonomi. These settlers included William Coddington, Anne and William Hutchinson, Philip Sherman, William Dyer, John Coggeshall, Nicholas Easton, William Brenton, John Clarke, and Richard Maxson (Maggsen). A gratutity was given of 40 fathoms of white wampum, 20 hoes, 10 coats plus more for the resident Narragansetts, and 5 more fathoms of wampum for the local sachem,. The Narragansett Sachems Canonicus and his nephew Miantonomi signed a deed for it. However, as Roger Williams made clear in a letter to John Winthrop in June 1638: “Sir, concerning the islands Prudence and…Aquedenick …neither of them were sold properly, for a thousand fathom would not have bought either, by strangers. The truth is, not a penny was demanded for either, and what was paid was only gratuity, though I chose, for better assurance and form, to call it sale.” These first settlers founded Pocasset, but William Coddington chose Newport for a settlement the following spring (1639) because of its excellent harbor, and some of the settlers followed him there.

The British army occupied Aquidneck Island during the American Revolution from 1776 to 1779.  The Continental Army under command of Major General John Sullivan attempted to drive them out in the Battle of Rhode Island on August 29, 1778, but without success.

Schools
The island is home to Salve Regina University, the Newport campus of the Community College of Rhode Island, and International Yacht Restoration School. Naval Station Newport is located on Aquidneck Island and the adjacent Coasters Harbor Island.

It is also home to two well known private boarding schools: St. George's School in Middletown and Portsmouth Abbey School in Portsmouth. The island also contains numerous public and private primary and secondary schools as a part of the school systems of Newport, Middletown and Portsmouth.

Bridges

The Claiborne Pell Newport Bridge (1969) connects Aquidneck Island to Jamestown on nearby Conanicut Island in Narragansett Bay, and subsequently to the mainland on the western side of the bay. The Mount Hope Bridge (1929) is adjacent to Bristol Ferry and Common Fence Point and connects the northern side of Aquidneck Island in Portsmouth to the mainland at Bristol. The Sakonnet River Bridge (2012) in Portsmouth connects the northeastern side of the island to the mainland at Tiverton over the Sakonnet River, a narrow saltwater strait. It is a replacement for a bridge of the same name built in 1956.

Environmental contamination
The west coast of Aquidneck Island is part of Naval Station Newport, a superfund site since 1989. Almost the entire area from its fuel tank farms drains into ditches and into Narragansett Bay. The Navy has been rehabbing the property following contamination from petroleum, heavy metals, including lead and arsenic, and polychlorinated biphenyls (PCBs) where there were electrical transformers. In addition there is PFAS substances contamination of groundwater and in surface runoff water. The groundwater is used for irrigation on crops and lawn sprinkler systems.

References

Further reading
 Aquidneck Indian Council, "A Brief History of Aquidneck Island" 

 "Aquidneck added to 2011 Map of Rhode Island". The Providence Journal, Monday, July 18, 2011, page A5.

External links

Islands of Newport County, Rhode Island
Islands of Narragansett Bay
Islands of Rhode Island